Horst Meyer (March 1, 1926 – August 14, 2016) was a Swiss scientist doing research in condensed matter physics.

Meyer was the son of the surgeon Arthur Woldemar Meyer in Berlin and the grandson of the pharmacologist Hans Horst Meyer. After Arthur's sudden death in 1933 he was adopted by the chemist Kurt Heinrich Meyer, the brother of Arthur, and grew up in Switzerland. After graduating from the Collège Jean Calvin in Geneva, he studied physics and physical chemistry at the universities of Geneva and of Zürich, obtaining his PhD in 1953. He was first a postdoctoral associate, later a Nuffield Fellow in the Clarendon Laboratory at the University of Oxford, from 1957 lecturer at Harvard University. In 1959 he was appointed an assistant professor at Duke University (where Fritz London was formerly on the faculty), and where he became in 1984 the Fritz London Professor and finally professor emeritus in 2004. Meyer died from cancer in 2016.

He was visiting professor at the Technische Universität München (1965), the University of Tokyo and Toyota Technological Institute in Nagoya, and also 1974 and 1975 at the Institut Laue–Langevin in Grenoble. In 1988 he was guest scientist of the Russian Academy of Sciences.

He was involved with experimental low temperature physics. Among the topics he did research upon were magnetic compounds, beta-quinone clathrate compounds, solid and liquid helium, solid hydrogen and deuterium, and various phase transitions such as order-disorder phase transitions in solid hydrogen. His studies also included  the normal–superfluid transition in helium-4 and in mixtures of helium-3 and helium-4, and also their liquid–vapor critical point. Furthermore, he did research on the Rayleigh–Bénard convection and its onset in supercritical helium-3. The list of his publications, as well as the list of his former PhD students and collaborators can be found in his weblink.

In 1993 he received the Fritz London Memorial Prize and in 1982 the Jesse Beams Award of the American Physical Society, of which he was a Fellow since 1970. From 1961 until 1965 he was an Alfred P. Sloan Fellow. In 2014 he was awarded the “University Medal”  of Duke University. One of his PhD students, Robert Coleman Richardson, shared the 1996 Nobel Prize in Physics with Douglas Osheroff and David Lee for the discovery of superfluidity in helium-3.

In 1953 he married Ruth Mary Hunter (deceased in 2013) and he has one son, Christopher, who is a staff physicist at the National Institute of Standards and Technology (NIST).

References

External links 
 Meyer homepage

1926 births
2016 deaths
Duke University faculty
Scientists from Berlin
Swiss physicists